Gabriela De Lemos (born 24 March 1997) is a Luxembourger footballer who plays as a midfielder for Racing FC Union Luxembourg and the Luxembourg women's national team.

Career
De Lemos has been capped for the Luxembourg national team, appearing for the team during the 2019 FIFA Women's World Cup qualifying cycle.

International goals

References

External links
 
 
 

1997 births
Living people
Luxembourgian women's footballers
Luxembourg women's international footballers
Luxembourgian people of Portuguese descent
Women's association football midfielders